Minnesota Women's Press is an American feminist monthly magazine founded in 1985, and as such is one of the oldest continuously published feminist platforms in the US. Since 2017, it is published by Mikki Morrissette.

History
Begun in 1984 by Mollie Hoben and Glenda Martin as a biweekly newspaper and launched on April 16, 1985, the publication became a monthly magazine in 2009 under former owners Norma Smith Olson and Kathy Magnuson. On December 14, 2017, Mikki Morrissette purchased the magazine, and serves as the current publisher and editor.

Editorial content
The magazine publishes the stories and aspirations of women who are ordinary and extraordinary, sometimes in their own words, and sometimes written by staff writers. The hope is that change building a better future will come from their collective energy.

Other projects
 The book 35 Years of Minnesota Women was published in 2020 to commemorate the magazine's 35th anniversary, and sold out its first edition.
 A Minnesota Women's Directory is published annually.

See also
 List of feminist literature
 List of American feminist literature

References

External links
 Official website
 

Alternative magazines
Lifestyle magazines published in the United States
Monthly magazines published in the United States
Political magazines published in the United States
Women's magazines published in the United States
Feminism in the United States
Feminist magazines
Liberal feminism
Magazines established in 1985
Magazines published in Minnesota
History of women in Minnesota